Exaltación may refer to several places in Bolivia:

Exaltación, Mamoré in Beni Department
Exaltación, Vaca Diéz, Beni Department
Exaltación Municipality, Yacuma Province, Beni Department

See also
 Exalt (disambiguation)